The Truths We Hold: An American Journey  is a memoir by Kamala Harris. The book was first published by Penguin Books on January 8, 2019. A young readers edition was published by Philomel Books on May 7, 2019.

Contents 
U.S. Vice President Kamala Harris details her life as the daughter of immigrants from Jamaica and India. She was born in Oakland, California, and raised in West Berkeley. She describes her childhood neighborhood as "a close-knit neighborhood of working families who were focused on doing a good job, paying the bills, and being there for one another."

Harris would eventually become the San Francisco district attorney in 2004. Her decision to become a prosecutor was so she could serve "the victims of crimes committed and the victims of a broken criminal justice system." Understanding this dichotomy, Harris describes herself as a progressive prosecutor. She elaborates:

The book continues on through her time as California Attorney General, her face-off against fellow Democrat Loretta Sanchez in the 2016 U.S. Senate election, and ends with her touting her fights against the Trump administration.

Reception
Kirkus Reviews often compared the book favorably to Barack Obama's memoir Dreams from My Father. Likewise, Library Journal praised Harris for "[using] her life story to argue for a new way of treating our problems."

Other contemporary reviews were more mixed. Also comparing the book to Obama's follow-up memoir The Audacity of Hope, Hannah Giorgis of The Atlantic said Harris lacked Obama's literary finesse for both biography and political vision. Similarly, Danielle Kurtzleben of NPR criticized the awkward prose and lack of strong anecdotes. One such instance: Harris's brief mention of initially struggling to pass the bar exam could have been expanded into a more interesting narrative about perseverance. However, both reviewers agreed that the book served as a sufficient launching point for a potential presidential campaign. Indeed, Harris would announce her 2020 presidential campaign later that January.

In a retrospective review, Carlos Lozada of The Washington Post echoed similar sentiments, while noting that Harris's kind words about the late Beau Biden (whose tenure as Delaware Attorney General overlapped with Harris's tenure in California) was a likely factor in Joe Biden's decision to select her as his 2020 campaign running mate.

References

External links
Book interview with Jonathan Capehart at George Washington University (January 9, 2019)

2019 non-fiction books
American political books
Books by Kamala Harris
English-language books
Penguin Books books
Political memoirs